Bremen High School may refer to various schools in the United States:

Bremen High School (Georgia), Bremen, Georgia
Bremen High School (Midlothian, Illinois), Midlothian, Illinois
Bremen High School (Bremen, Indiana), Bremen, Indiana

See also
New Bremen High School, New Bremen, Ohio